Amor Louco (Portuguese for Mad Love) is the fourth studio album by Brazilian post-punk band Fellini. It was released on February 15, 1990 by now-defunct independent record label Wop-Bop Records and re-released in CD form in 2001 by another independent label, RDS. It was originally Fellini's last album, due to their break-up in the following year; however, they reunited in 2001 and released another album, Amanhã É Tarde. After his absence from the previous album, Jair Marcos returned as the guitarist, thus having Fellini's original line-up once more.

Amor Louco is characterized for the diminished "scuzzy" post-punk-esque instrumentation, instead adopting a more light-hearted style reminiscent of samba rock, bossa nova and MPB. It is also their first album to feature lyrics written in English, them being "Chico Buarque Song" and "Love Till the Morning".

The track "LSD" narrates an experience frontman Cadão Volpato had when he used lysergic acid diethylamide.

Track listing

Notes
 "Aeroporto" is an acoustic bonus track.
 The CD re-release merges the tracks "É o Destino" and "Aeroporto" into one, thus making a single track with 5:58 minutes long and making "Aeroporto" a hidden bonus track.

Personnel
 Fellini
 Cadão Volpato — vocals, harmonica, keyboards 
 Jair Marcos — acoustic guitar, backing vocals 
 Ricardo Salvagni — bass, rhythm programming 
 Thomas Pappon — acoustic guitar, backing vocals, rhythm programming

 Additional personnel
 Tancred Pappon — cavaquinho (on tracks 6, 9)
 Karla Xavier — female backing vocals (on track 9)
 R.H Jackson — rhythm programming (on track 7)

 Miscellaneous staff
Recorded from June to November 1989 at OBJ Studio (16 channels), São Paulo
 Célia Saito — photography
 Cadão Volpato — cover (drawing)
 N artes — final art
 R. H. Jackson and Fellini — production and mixing
 Benoni Rubmaier — remastering (cd version)
 Remastered in Y B studios
 Alex Cecci — A & R
 Adaptation and Photolithography — 23 design
 1989 end of the Berlin Wall

References

External links
 Amor Louco at Fellini's official Bandcamp
 Amor Louco at Deezer
 Amor Louco at Discogs
 Amor Louco at Rate Your Music
 Amor Louco at MusicBrainz

1990 albums
Fellini (band) albums
Portuguese-language albums